The 1992 Porsche Tennis Grand Prix was a women's tennis tournament played on indoor hard courts at the Filderstadt Tennis Centre in Filderstadt, Germany and was part of the Tier II of the 1992 WTA Tour. It was the 15th edition of the tournament and was held from 12 October to 18 October 1992. On her 36th birthday third-seeded Martina Navratilova won the singles title, her sixth at the event, and earned $70,000 first-prize money.

Finals

Singles
 Martina Navratilova defeated  Gabriela Sabatini 7–6(7–1), 6–3
 It was Navratilova's 4th singles title of the year and the 161st of her career.

Doubles
 Arantxa Sánchez Vicario /  Helena Suková defeated  Pam Shriver /  Natasha Zvereva 6–4, 7–5

Prize money and ranking points

References

External links
 Official website 
 ITF tournament edition details
 Tournament draws

Porsche Tennis Grand Prix
Porsche Tennis Grand Prix
Porsche Tennis Grand Prix
1990s in Baden-Württemberg
Porsche Tennis Grand Prix
Porsch